Archactenis is a genus of moths belonging to the subfamily Tortricinae of the family Tortricidae.

Species
Archactenis centrostricta  (Diakonoff, 1941) 
Archactenis haplozona  (Meyrick, 1921)

See also
List of Tortricidae genera

References

External links
tortricidae.com

Tortricidae genera